R-spondin 2 also known as roof plate-specific spondin-2 is a secreted protein that in humans that is encoded by the RSPO2 gene.

R-spondin 2 synergizes with canonical WNT to activate beta-catenin. RSPO2 has been proposed to regulate craniofacial patterning and morphogenesis within pharyngeal arch 1 through ectoderm-mesenchyme signaling via the endothelin-Dlx5/6 pathway.

In dogs, a variant on the Rspo2 gene is associated moustache and eyebrow thickness.

In humans, recessive mutations in RSPO2 abrogate limb and lung development. Bruno Reversade and colleagues have reported in 2018 that loss of RSPO2 results in a syndrome of Tetra-amelia with lung agenesis.

References 

Glycoproteins
Extracellular matrix proteins